This is a list of lists of videos.

YouTube
 List of most-viewed YouTube videos
 List of most-viewed Indian YouTube videos
 List of most-viewed Pakistani YouTube videos
 List of most-disliked YouTube videos
 List of most-liked YouTube videos

Music
 List of viral music videos
 List of most expensive music videos
 List of music videos featuring nudity

Other
 List of viral videos
 List of most-viewed online videos in the first 24 hours
 List of most-liked TikTok videos

See also

online